Salam  is a rural commune of the Cercle of Timbuktu in the Tombouctou Region of Mali. The commune contains 26 villages and in the 2009 census had a population of 17,139. The commune is administered from Agouni. The commune includes the oasis village of Araouane.

References

External links
.

Communes of Tombouctou Region